Gifts of Unknown Things: A True Story of Nature, Healing, and Initiation from Indonesia's Dancing Island (1976) is a book by Lyall Watson. It recounts a true adventure; washed onto a remote island in Indonesia, he is greeted by local people who have a strong and mystic culture and a unique comprehension of colour, sound and movement.

Jim Capaldi's song "Gifts of Unknown Things", from his album Fierce Heart, was inspired by the book.

References

Books about Indonesia
1976 books
Indonesian culture